The Ottawa Sport Hall of Fame is a hall of fame dedicated to recognizing athletes and sportspeople associated with Ottawa, Ontario, Canada. It is located in Ottawa City Hall and includes over 270 inductees as of 2019.

History
The Ottawa Sport Hall of Fame opened in 1968, located at the Ottawa Civic Centre. It has since moved to the second floor of the Corel Centre in 2005, then to its current home at Ottawa City Hall in 2011. It is maintained by a volunteer board of directors, and enshrines its inductees into either athletes, builders or media member categories. Inductees are selected from community nominations, with consideration given to represent all sport contributions in Ottawa. It is a non-profit organization, and maintains memorabilia and commemorative plaques for more than 270 inductees as of 2019.

Inductees
The following groups and individuals have been inducted into the hall of fame:

Groups

 1948 Ottawa RCAF Flyers
 1968 Ottawa Rough Riders
 1969 Ottawa Rough Riders
 1975 Ottawa Gee-Gees football team
 Eldon Coombe rink 
 Isabelle & Paul Duchesnay
 Ottawa Sports and Entertainment Group

Individuals

 Jess Abelson
 T. Franklin Ahearn
 Daniel Alfredsson
 Caroll-Ann Alie
 Gail Amundrud
 Frank Amyot
 Roland Armitage
 Jeff Avery
 Jack Alexander Barber
 Jeff Bean
 Clint Benedict
 Chantal Benoit
 Sam Berger
 Marjorie Blackwood
 Leo Boivin
 Donald P. Booth
 Enée Bordeleau
 Frank Boucher
 Georges Boucher
 Sheryl Boyle
 George Brancato
 Bernie Brennan
 Punch Broadbent
 D. Wes Brown
 Rod Bryden
 Horst Bulau
 Desmond T. Burke
 Ernie Butter-worth
 Ernie Calcutt
 Gerald Bruce Campbell
 R. D. Campbell
 Linda Carbonetto
 Marc Cardinal
 Tom Casey
 Gerry Cassan
 Rick Cassata
 Barbara Caswell-McLeod
 Michael A. Chambers
 Al Charron
 Georges Chénier
 Frank Clair
 King Clancy
 Tom Clements
 Betsy Clifford
 Harvey Clifford
 John Clifford
 Edmund Condon
 Alec Connell
 Charlie Connell
 Jim Conroy
 Emile Côté
 Bill Cowley
 Renn Crichlow 
 Jack Darragh
 Howard Darwin
 Eddie Daugherty
 W. F. A. Davies
 Cy Denneny
 Joseph Paul Ernest Désabrais
 Claude Deschamps
 Rick Desclouds 
 Michel Dessureault
 Judy Elizabeth Dietiker-Davison
 Charlie Diffin
 Bill Dineen
 Mariann Domonkos
 John Donaldson
 Jack Donohue
 Cecil Duncan
 Jake Dunlap
 Jim Durrell
 Eddie Emerson
 Bob Ferguson
 Hervé Filion
 Frank Finnigan
 Bruce Firestone
 Jim Foley
 Thomas Clarence Foley
 Anna Fraser
 Alexa Fraser-Stirling
 John D. Fripp
 Doug Frobel
 Barclay Frost
 Tony Gabriel
 Garry Galley
 Don M. Gamble
 Eddie Gerard
 Wayne Giardino
 Heather Giford-Seaman
 Glenroy Gilbert
 Dave Gill
 Billy Gilmour
 Edward P. Gleeson
 Tony Golab
 Ebbie Goodfellow
 Tommy Gorman
 Paul Gratton
 Steve Gray
 Hélène Madeleine Grégoire
 Kristina Groves
 Patsy Guzzo
 John Halvorsen
 Gord Hamilton
 Robert Bruce Hamilton
 Barney Hartman
 Mary Haydon-Provos
 Anne Heggtveit
 Joan Hendry
 Charlie Henry
 Tiny Hermann
 Condredge Holloway
 Sue Holloway
 Don Holtby
 Charmaine Hooper
 Edward James Houston
 Syd Howe
 Debbie Huband
 Bouse Hutton
 Linda Jackson
 Russ Jackson
 Coco Jarry
 Aurèle Joliat
 Gil-O Julien
 Dan Kelly
 Clayton Kenny
 Gale Allen Kerwin
 Terry Kielty
 Brian Kilrea
 Hec Kilrea
 Ray Kinsella
 Bruce Kirby
 Kristina Kiss
 Alison Korn
 Mark Kosmos
 Jim Kyte
 Rocky Lacelle
 Lally Lalonde
 Lloyd Laporte
 Ed Laverty
 Alexander Smirle Lawson
 Cyril Leeder
 Tae Eun Lee
 Ken Lehmann
 Percy LeSueur
 Don Loney
 Neil Lumsden
 Brian Thomas Lynch
 Don Lyon
 Eddie MacCabe
 Kilby MacDonald
 Phil Maloney
 Elizabeth Manley
 Alain Marion
 Pat Marsden
 Wally Masters
 Jimmy McCaffrey
 Dave McCann
 Fred C. McCann
 Donald Stuart McDiarmid
 Brian McFarlane
 Frank McGee
 Jim McKenny
 Anne Merklinger
 Horace Merrill
 Pat Messner
 Philip Arnold Samuel Midgley
 Ian Millar
 Joe Miller
 Hazel Minor
 Gordon Montagno
 Frederick George Morris
 Janet Morrissey
 Charles E. Mortureux
 Shirley Moulds
 Cliff Murchison
 Bryan Murray
 James Naismith
 Cliff Neill
 Mike Nemesvary
 Joseph André Rodolphe Nézan
 Todd Nicholson
 Frank Nighbor
 Lynn Nightingale
 Bob O'Billovich
 Ambrose O'Brien
 Gerry Organ
 Ken Parker
 Bill Patterson
 Chuck Paul
 Ann Peel
 Wash Pelletier
 Gordon Perry
 Chris Phillips
 Jacques Pilon
 Joe Poirier
 Dale Potter
 Ross Potter
 Denis Potvin
 Johnny Powers
 Harvey Pulford
 Johnny Quilty
 Silver Quilty
 Moe Racine
 Al Rae
 Bob Rathwell
 Larry Regan
 Pat Reid
 Glenda Reiser
 Hugh Riopelle
 Bob Ripley
 Gordon Roberts
 Larry Robinson
 Mel Rogers
 Gus Sanderson
 Joey Sandulo
 Dave Schreiber
 Gary Schreider
 Barbara Ann Scott
 Richard Patrick Scott
 Randy Sexton
 Liv Sherwood
 Betty Shields
 Hap Shouldice
 Chris Simboli
 Bob Simpson
 Alf Smith
 Billy Smith
 Bobby Smith
 Brian Smith
 Claire Chapman Smith
 Des Smith
 Gary Edward Smith
 Tommy Smith
 Dave Sprague
 Harold Starr
 Ron Stewart
 Ken Stroulger
 Bruce Stuart
 Hod Stuart
 Mel Swartman
 Ray Takahashi
 Tina Takahashi
 Cyclone Taylor
 Dave Thelen
 Jean-Yves Thériault
 Shirley Laura Thomas
 Linda Thom
 Brian Timmis
 Andy Tommy
 Andrew Joseph Richard Tommy
 Art Tommy
 Bill Touhey
 Joe Tubman
 Whit Tucker
 Jack Varaleau
 Charles Kaye Vaughan
 Dawn Ventura 
 Heather Wallace
 J. C. Watts
 Penny Werthner-Bales
 Rat Westwick
 Bill Westwick
 Doug Wilson
 Murray Wilson
 Donald Alexander Young
 Steve Yzerman 
 Joe Zelikovitz

2019
The inductees for 2019 were Chantal Benoit, Chris Phillips, Rick Desclouds, John Halvorsen and both the 1968 and 1969 Ottawa Rough Riders teams. They were inducted at a ceremony at the Horticultural Building at Lansdowne Park on May 31, 2019.

2020–21
The 2020 induction ceremony was postponed until 2021 due to the COVID-19 pandemic in Ottawa. The inductees were Dave Smart, Marina Zenk, Dr. Don Johnson and Phil Ashcroft, John Therien and Derek Holmes.

References

External links
 

Halls of fame in Canada
Museums in Ottawa
Sports museums in Canada
All-sports halls of fame
Awards established in 1968
Museums established in 1968
City museums in Canada